Michael Scott is a British academic and university administrator.  A professor of English literature, he was vice-chancellor of Glyndŵr University in Wrexham, Wales until 2015.

Educated at the University of Wales, Lampeter and the University of Nottingham, Scott holds a PhD from De Montfort University.  He was professor of English and head of the school of humanities at Sunderland Polytechnic, before becoming pro vice-chancellor of De Montfort University in 1989.  Scott was, for 14 years, visiting professor of English at Georgetown University, Washington, D.C.

References

Living people
Year of birth missing (living people)
Academics of De Montfort University
Academics of the University of Sunderland
Alumni of De Montfort University
Alumni of the University of Nottingham
Alumni of the University of Wales, Lampeter
British literary critics
Georgetown University faculty
Literary critics of English
People associated with Wrexham Glyndŵr University